Actinemys is a small genus of turtles in the family Emydidae.  The genus is endemic to the west coast of North America. The genus contains two species.

Species
The following two species are recognized as being valid.
Actinemys marmorata  – northwestern pond turtle, northern Pacific pond turtle
Actinemys pallida  – southwestern pond turtle, southern Pacific pond turtle

Nota bene: A binomial authority in parentheses indicates that the species was originally described in a genus other than Actinemys.

Taxonomy
Both species are sometimes included in the genus  Emys (sensu lato). Actinemys pallida, the southwestern pond turtle, has been a recent split from Actinemys marmorata, of which it was previously considered a subspecies.

References

Further reading
Agassiz L (1857). Contributions to the Natural History of the United States. Vol I. Boston: Little, Brown and Company. li + 452 pp. (Actinemys, new genus, p. 444).

 
Turtle genera
Taxa named by Louis Agassiz